Omuntele is a village with almost 2,000 inhabitants in the Oshikoto region in the north-east of Namibia. The village is located in a high plateau with 1,089 meters above sea level. D. Sea level and has an airfield.

Omuntele Constituency is also the administrative seat of the same constituency ( English : Constituency) km² with an area of 1,149 and 26,000 inhabitants (NA.OT.OT).

See also
 Administrative divisions of Namibia

References

Constituencies of Oshikoto Region